Cambridge South railway station is a planned railway station located in Cambridge adjacent to Addenbrooke's Hospital and Cambridge Biomedical Campus. The station will be on the Cambridge line and West Anglia Main Line. It is planned to open in 2025.

Background
A new station was proposed in 2017. In August 2017, the Transport Secretary backed plans for a new station as part of the East West Rail plan, with a possible opening date of 2021, that could also include a light rail link. An unsuccessful application was made to the New Stations Fund 2 in 2017, but £5million was allocated to the project in the November 2017 Budget Speech.

Funding for Cambridge South station was announced in the budget of March 2020. Three options for its location near Addenbrooke's Hospital were identified between the Cambridgeshire Guided Busway bridge on Cambridge Biomedical Campus to the north and the Addenbrooke’s Road bridge to the south. Network Rail stated that its preferred location for the station was at a site adjacent to the Biomedical Campus and the Guided Busway crossing and submitted a Transport and Works Act Order application in June 2021 for a station on this site.

In September 2022, the government announced Cambridge South as one of the "138 major infrastructure projects that the Government aims to fast-track, although "inclusion in the list [does] not guarantee funding, planning consent or approval at this stage".

Funding approved
In December 2022, the station was given a Transport and Works Act Order approval. This means construction can proceed on the track realignments and station building. , detailed design of the station building remains to be done and planning approval secured.

East West Rail

In its 2021 Route Alignment consultation, the East West Rail Company proposes that its new alignment into Cambridge will do so via Cambridge South.

Services

References

External links
 Cambridge South: a new station in the south of Cambridge, National Rail

Proposed railway stations in England
Rail transport in Cambridge
East West Rail